High Maintenance is an American anthology comedy-drama television and web series created by ex-husband and wife team Ben Sinclair and Katja Blichfeld. The show follows The Guy, a cannabis courier (played by Sinclair), as he delivers his product to clients in the New York City borough of Brooklyn. Each episode focuses on different characters as their lives intersect with The Guy. The full series consists of six web series followed by four television seasons, released from November 2012 to April 2020.

High Maintenance originally premiered as a web series on Vimeo on November 11, 2012, and began airing as a television series on HBO on September 16, 2016. The show's second HBO season premiered on January 19, 2018, and its third on January 20, 2019. HBO renewed the series for a fourth season, which premiered on February 7, 2020. On January 14, 2021, it was confirmed that the series would not return for a fifth season.

High Maintenance has received critical acclaim for its portrayals of boredom, loneliness, and the human condition. First season episodes "Meth(od)" and "Grandpa" both placed on numerous year-end lists in 2016, while second season episode "Globo" was ranked as one of the best episodes of 2018 by sources such as  Time and Variety.

Structure
Largely lacking serial plotlines, the show consists of vignettes in the lives of various New Yorkers as they come into direct or indirect contact with The Guy. The web series was shot throughout various neighborhoods in Brooklyn and occasionally Manhattan, and its episodes range from 5 to 20 minutes in length. "Freed of the constraints of thirty-minute or one-hour formulas, the episodes are luxurious and twisty and humane, radiating new ideas about storytelling," wrote television critic Emily Nussbaum in an article for The New Yorker.

When the series moved to HBO, its episodes expanded to the half-hour format. The television version continued the practice of on-location photography.

Episodes

Production
Sinclair said that the TV shows Six Feet Under and Party Down were inspirations for the web series.

The talent pool in New York City is rich—and familiar to Blichfeld (who is an Emmy Award-winning casting director of 30 Rock). Each episode cost less than $1,000 to make.

In June 2014, Vimeo announced that the website would provide financial backing for upcoming episodes of original programming via their Vimeo on Demand platform.

Vimeo funded six episodes of High Maintenance before the series was picked up by HBO. Three episodes were released November 11, 2014, and the remaining three on February 5, 2015.

Critical response
Critical response has been positive. The actor Dan Stevens, who later appeared on the show, calls it "a brilliant collection of succinct character portraits from a cross-section of New York society." Jenji Kohan said that High Maintenance was one of her favorite recent discoveries, calling the episodes little jewels, "beautiful glimpses into people's lives," "really well crafted," "delicious."

The Guy often interacts with members of the Jewish community in the areas of New York that he services, and he himself is Jewish. This aspect of the series has been noted approvingly by Jewish reviewers for its representation of contemporary Jewish life. Ethnic diversity in the show as it moved from web series to an HBO series has also been noted.

Notable cast
Ben Sinclair, the co-creator of the web series, appears as "The Guy" (named in the finale as Rufus Mann), a marijuana delivery courier.
Dan Stevens appears as a cross-dressing screenwriter named Colin in the web series episode "Rachel" and three episodes of the HBO series.
Katja Blichfeld appears as Becky, the wife of Dan Stevens' cross-dressing character in the web series episode "Rachel" and four episodes of the HBO series. Blichfeld is also the co-creator of the series.
Rosie Perez appears as Adriana in the episode "Proxy" in Season 3.
Hannibal Buress appears as himself in the episodes "Jonathan" and "Selfie".
Abdullah Saeed appears as Abdullah, a temporary partner to The Guy in Season 2.
Max Jenkins and Heléne Yorke appear in several episodes as a pair of loathsome "Assholes" from the fashion world.
Christopher Caldwell (Bob the Drag Queen) appears as Darnell, a recovering addict in "Meth(od)."
Kate Lyn Sheil appears as Jules, The Guy's ex-wife who he remains friends with.
Yael Stone appears as Beth, one of The Guy's customers and budding romantic partner, a quirky, mushroom-dealing Australian who lives in Bushwick.
Michael Cyril Creighton appears as Patrick, a lonely agoraphobic obsessed with Helen Hunt and secretly in love with The Guy.
Gaby Hoffmann appears as a yoga practitioner and attendee of the day rave in season 1, episode 4 ("Tick").
Lena Dunham appears as herself filming an episode of Girls in "Selfie".
Britt Lower appears as Lee, a love interest for The Guy in Season 3.
Nick Kroll and Rebecca Hall appear as themselves in Season 4.
Ira Glass, the host and producer of This American Life appears as himself in Season 4.
Martha Stewart appears as herself in Season 4.

References

External links
 
 
Web series blog
High Maintenance on HBO
High Maintenance on Vimeo

2016 American television series debuts
2020 American television series endings
2010s American comedy-drama television series
2010s American LGBT-related comedy television series
2020s American comedy-drama television series
2020s American LGBT-related comedy television series
American comedy web series
American television series about cannabis
Comedy-drama web series
English-language television shows
HBO original programming
Television series about illegal drug trade
Television series based on Internet-based works
Television shows filmed in New York (state)
Television shows set in New York City
2010s American LGBT-related drama television series
2020s American LGBT-related drama television series
American LGBT-related web series